Skorpion Zinc is a zinc mine in the ǁKaras Region of southern Namibia, producing Special High Grade (SHG) zinc. The mine is situated near Rosh Pinah. It was established at a cost of US$450 million by Anglo American in 2003. It is the tenth-largest zinc mine in the world, and the largest employer in Rosh Pinah, providing 1,900 jobs.

Skorpion is a unique mine in several ways. Firstly, it is a supergene zinc ore body composed of alluvial accumulations of zinc carbonate and silicate minerals of detrital nature deposited within a palaeochannel. There are no other currently commercially viable deposits of this type. It is also one of the few mines in the world that currently mines zinc oxides, a mixture of non-sulphidic zinc minerals such as smithsonite, hydrozincite, tarbuttite and willemite. Finally, it is the only zinc processing facility to use solvent extraction-electrowinning metallurgy to process and refine its zinc products (others using conventional smelting and roasting).

The Skorpion SX-EW plant creates Special High Grade, ultra-pure zinc cathode as a primary product, which is so low in impurities that it commands a price premium.

In November 2010 the project was acquired by Vedanta Resources at a cost of US$707 million. In 2019, Vedanta announced mining would be suspended for a four months due to technical problems. Then in 2020 Vedanta placed the mine on care and maintenance due to pit failures.

See also
 Rosh Pinah mine

References

Sources

See also 
 Mining in Namibia

Surface mines in Namibia
Lead and zinc mines in Namibia
Economic geology
2003 establishments in Namibia
Buildings and structures in ǁKaras Region
Vedanta Resources